The 2005–06 season was the third year of the Elite One Championship, the top-level rugby league French Championship.

Table 

Note: (C) = champions, (R) = relegated

Grand Final

See also 
 Rugby league in France
 French Rugby League Championship
 Elite One Championship IV

References

Rugby league competitions in France
2005 in French rugby league
2006 in French rugby league